Eliott Mounoud (born 10 August 1995) is a Swiss beach soccer player who plays as a goalkeeper for the Swiss national team. Besides Switzerland, he has played in Georgia, Costa Rica, Israel, Ukraine, Poland, Russia, Portugal, and Spain.

Career
Mounoud has lived in Torredembarra, Spain since the age of five and originally wanted to represent the Spanish national team, and so initially rejected calls from Switzerland. However, after failing to be called up by Spain, he eventually accepted the opportunity to represent his birth nation, debuting in 2017 aged 22.

He helped Switzerland reach third place at the 2021 FIFA Beach Soccer World Cup (claiming the Golden Glove) and was awarded the 2021 and 2022 best goalkeeper in the world award at the Beach Soccer Stars ceremony.

References

External links
 Eliott Mounoud at playmakerstats.com 

1995 births
Association football goalkeepers
Living people
Swiss beach soccer players
Beach soccer goalkeepers
Swiss expatriate sportspeople in Israel
Swiss expatriate sportspeople in Poland
Swiss expatriate sportspeople in Portugal
Swiss expatriate sportspeople in Russia
Swiss expatriate sportspeople in Ukraine
Swiss men's footballers